Eddie Blake may refer to:

 Eddie Blake (Watchmen), a Watchmen character
 Eddie Blake (American football) (born 1969), American football offensive guard